{{DISPLAYTITLE:C14H23NO2}}
The molecular formula C14H23NO2 (molar mass: 237.343 g/mol) may refer to:

 2,5-Dimethoxy-4-isopropylamphetamine
 2,5-Dimethoxy-4-propylamphetamine

Molecular formulas